Jiří Žák (born 24 June 1978) is a Czech kickboxer and Muay thai fighter. He is the former ISKA and WMC champion.

Martial arts career
Žák  participated in the 2009 March Souboj Titánů Cruiserweight tournament. He defeated Milan Hrubý by KO in the semifinals, and Tomáš Šenkýř by a third-round TKO in the finals.

Žák won two WFCA World titles. In 2010 he won the WFCA 82.5 kg title by a first-round TKO of Clifton Brown, and in 2011 the WFCA 86 kg title, through a unanimous decision win over Fred Sikking.

Jiří Žák fought for the inaugural Enfusion 85 kg title against Mirko Cingel at Enfusion 14. Cingel won the bout by unanimous decision.

During the Česko vs Chorvatsko event, Žák fought Ivan Stanić for the ISKA World Cruiserweight title. Zak won the fight by a third-round TKO.

He fought Petr Ondruš during W5 Legends Grand Prix. Zak won the fight by TKO.

Championships and accomplishments
 1997 Czech Muay Thai Association Champion
 1998 Czech Muay Thai Association Champion
 1999 Czech Muay Thai Association Champion
 2001 International Sport Karate Association Champion
 2002 Czech Muay Thai Association Champion
 2005 It's Showtime 75MAX Trophy Preliminary Champion
 2006 World Muaythai Council Cruiserweight Champion
 2007 5 Knockout Fight Night Tournament Winner
 2008 World Muaythai Council Cruiserweight I-1 Tournament Winner
 2008 Czech International Pro Kickboxing Champion
 2008 Eight Brawl Cruiserweight Tournament Winner
 2009 Souboj Titanu Cruiserweight Tournament Winner
 2009 Souboj Titanu Cruiserweight Tournament Winner
 2010 World Full Contact Association 82.5 kg Champion
 2011 World Full Contact Association 86 kg Champion 
 2015 International Sport Karate Association World Muay Thai Cruiserweight Champion

Fight record

|- style="background:#cfc;"
| 2018-4-19 || Win ||align=left| Zhou Wei || XFN || Prague, Czech Republic || Decision (Unanimous) || 3 || 3:00
|- style="background:#cfc;"
| 2017-11-25 || Win ||align=left| Akhmet Alimbekov || Souboj Titánů || Plzeň, Czech Republic || TKO || 3 ||
|- style="background:#cfc;"
| 2016-10-8 || Win ||align=left| Petr Ondrus || W5 Grand Prix Legends in Prague || Prague, Czech Republic || TKO || 1 ||
|- style="background:#cfc;"
| 2016-4-15 || Win ||align=left| Teo Radnić || Souboj Titánů || Plzeň, Czech Republic || TKO || 3 ||
|- style="background:#fbb;"
| 2015-12-5 || Loss ||align=left| Daniel Forsberg || Gibu Fight Night 2 || Prague, Czech Republic || Decision (Unanimous) || 3 || 3:00
|- style="background:#cfc;"
| 2015-9-27 || Win ||align=left| Ivan Stanić || Česko vs Chorvatsko || Brno, Czech Republic || TKO || 3 || 
|-
! style=background:white colspan=9 |
|- style="background:#cfc;"
| 2014-11-28 || Win ||align=left| Iwan Pang Atjok || Souboj Titánů || Plzeň, Czech Republic || KO ||  ||
|- style="background:#cfc;"
| 2014-6-12 || Win ||align=left| Hicham El Gaoui || Gibu Fight Night || Prague, Czech Republic || Decision (Unanimous) || 3 || 3:00
|- style="background:#fbb;"
| 2014-4-26 || Loss ||align=left| Mirko Cingel || Enfusion 14 || Žilina, Slovakia || Decision (Unanimous) || 5 || 3:00
|-
! style=background:white colspan=9 |
|- style="background:#cfc;"
| 2014-4-26 || Win ||align=left| Rustam Guseinov || Enfusion 14 || Žilina, Slovakia || Decision (Unanimous) || 4 || 3:00
|- style="background:#cfc;"
| 2014-4-4 || Win ||align=left| David Keclik || Souboj Titánů || Plzeň, Czech Republic || TKO || 3 ||
|- style="background:#fbb;"
| 2013-4-27 || Loss ||align=left| Vladimir Idrany || Gala Night Žilina|| Žilina, Slovakia || Decision (Unanimous) || 3 || 3:00
|- style="background:#fbb;"
| 2011-11-6 || Loss ||align=left| Artem Vakhitov || Muaythai Premier League: Third Round Netherlands || The Hague, Netherlands || Decision (Unanimous) || 3 || 3:00
|- style="background:#fbb;"
| 2011-10-8 || Loss ||align=left| Marc de Bonte || Muaythai Premier League: Second Round Italy || Padova, Italy || Decision (Unanimous) || 3 || 3:00
|- style="background:#cfc;"
| 2011-5-27 || Win ||align=left| Fred Sikking || Grand Prix Chomutov || Nitra, Slovakia || Decision (Unanimous) || 5 || 3:00
|-
! style=background:white colspan=9 |
|- style="background:#cfc;"
| 2011-4-14 || Win ||align=left| Cedric Coopra || Superliga || Czech Republic || TKO || 3 ||
|- style="background:#fbb;"
| 2010-11-27 || Loss ||align=left| Rickard Nordstand || Rumble of the Kings: Kruth Vs Sapp || Stockholm, Sweden || Decision (Unanimous) || 3 || 3:00
|- style="background:#cfc;"
| 2010-6-25 || Win ||align=left| Donald Berner || Czech Grand Prix || Prague, Czech Republic || KO ||  ||
|- style="background:#cfc;"
| 2010-3-20 || Win ||align=left| Clifton Brown || Gala Night Thai Boxing || Žilina, Slovakia || TKO ||  || 
|-
! style=background:white colspan=9 |
|- style="background:#cfc;"
| 2009-11-22 || Win ||align=left| Tomas Senkyr || Souboj Titánů, Tournament Final || Plzeň, Czech Republic || Decision (Majority) || 3 || 3:00
|-
! style=background:white colspan=9 |
|- style="background:#cfc;"
| 2009-11-22 || Win ||align=left| Artem Vakhitov || Souboj Titánů, Tournament Semifinal || Plzeň, Czech Republic || Decision (Unanimous) || 4 || 3:00
|- style="background:#cfc;"
| 2009-11-22 || Win ||align=left| Priest West || Souboj Titánů, Tournament Quarterfinal || Plzeň, Czech Republic || Decision (Majority) || 3 || 3:00
|- style="background:#cfc;"
| 2009-10-17 || Win ||align=left| Alexey Kunchenko || Souboj Titánů || Plzeň, Czech Republic || Decision (Majority) || 3 || 3:00
|- style="background:#cfc;"
| 2009-6-25 || Win ||align=left| Pavel Turuk || Gladiators Games || Prague, Czech Republic || KO || 3 ||
|- style="background:#cfc;"
| 2009-5-16 || Win ||align=left| Raymond Gimenez || Légendes & Guerriers || Toulouse, France || KO (Injury) || 4 ||
|- style="background:#cfc;"
| 2009-4-17 || Win ||align=left| Tomas Senkyr || Souboj Titánů, Tournament Final || Plzeň, Czech Republic || TKO || 3 ||
|- style="background:#cfc;"
| 2009-4-17 || Win ||align=left| Milan Hruby || Souboj Titánů, Tournament Semifinal || Plzeň, Czech Republic || KO || 1 || 
|-
! style=background:white colspan=9 |
|- style="background:#cfc;"
| 2009-3-14 || Win ||align=left| Erik Kozstenko || Gala Night Thaiboxing || Žilina, Slovakia || Decision (Unanimous) || 3 || 3:00
|- style="background:#cfc;"
| 2008-12-17 || Win ||align=left| Albert Kriezu || International Czech Title Kick box || Prague, Czech Republic || Decision (Unanimous) || 3 || 3:00
|-
! style=background:white colspan=9 |
|- style="background:#cfc;"
| 2008-10-11 || Win ||align=left| Erik Kozstenko || WMC I-1, Tournament Final || Prague, Czech Republic || KO ||  || 
|-
! style=background:white colspan=9 |
|- style="background:#cfc;"
| 2008-10-11 || Win ||align=left| Marcel Jager || WMC I-1, Tournament Semifinal || Prague, Czech Republic || Decision (Unanimous) || 3 || 3:00
|- style="background:#cfc;"
| 2008-10-11 || Win ||align=left| Martin Tomascik || WMC I-1, Tournament Quarterfinal || Prague, Czech Republic || KO ||  ||
|- style="background:#cfc;"
| 2008-6-14 || Win ||align=left| Ruben Van Der Giesen || Eight Brawl, Tournament Final || Copenhagen, Denmark || KO || 2 || 
|-
! style=background:white colspan=9 |
|- style="background:#cfc;"
| 2008-6-14 || Win ||align=left| Ali Reza || Eight Brawl, Tournament Semifinal || Copenhagen, Denmark || Decision (Unanimous) || 3 || 3:00
|- style="background:#cfc;"
| 2008-6-14 || Win ||align=left| Ole Laursen || Eight Brawl, Tournament Quarterfinal || Copenhagen, Denmark || TKO || 3 ||
|- style="background:#fbb;"
| 2008-3-15 || Loss ||align=left| Sem Braan || It's Showtime: Finale Trophy MAX 75 || Copenhagen, Denmark || TKO || 3 ||
|- style="background:#cfc;"
| 2007-6-23 || Win ||align=left| Roberto Cocco || 5 Knockout Fight Night, Tournament Final || Lucerne, Switzerland || Decision (Unanimous) || 3 || 3:00
|-
! style=background:white colspan=9 |
|- style="background:#cfc;"
| 2007-6-23 || Win ||align=left| Luís Reis || 5 Knockout Fight Night, Tournament Semifinal || Lucerne, Switzerland || KO ||  ||
|- style="background:#fbb;"
| 2007-4-14 || Loss ||align=left| Younes El Mhassani || Knockout Fight Night || Lucerne, Switzerland || Decision (Unanimous) || 3 || 3:00
|- style="background:#cfc;"
| 2007-3-24 || Win ||align=left| Tarek Slimani || Fights At The Border V || Lommel, Belgium || Decision (Unanimous) || 3 || 3:00
|- style="background:#fbb;"
| 2006-12-16 || Loss ||align=left| Ondřej Hutník || K-1 Fighting Network Prague Round '07 || Prague, Czech Republic || Decision (Unanimous) || 3 || 3:00
|- style="background:#fbb;"
| 2006-9-23 || Loss ||align=left| Şahin Yakut || It's showtime: Finale || Rotterdam, Netherlands || Decision (Unanimous) || 3 || 3:00
|- style="background:#cfc;"
| 2007-5-12 || Win ||align=left| Sandris Tomsons ||  || Teplice, Czech Republic || KO ||  || 
|-
! style=background:white colspan=9 |
|- style="background:#fbb;"
| 2006-9-23 || Loss ||align=left| Ruben van der Giesen || Enter The Plaza || Netherlands || Decision (Unanimous) || 3 || 3:00
|- style="background:#cfc;"
| 2005-10-30 || Win ||align=left| Tarek Slimani || It's Showtime 75Max Trophy || Alkmaar, Netherlands || Decision (Unanimous) || 4 || 3:00
|- style="background:#cfc;"
| 2005-10-30 || Win ||align=left| Omar Tekin || It's Showtime 75Max Trophy || Alkmaar, Netherlands || Decision (Unanimous) || 3 || 3:00
|- style="background:#fbb;"
| 2005-7-23 || Loss ||align=left| Eugene Ekkelboom || ||  ||  ||  || 
|-
! style=background:white colspan=9 |
|-
| colspan=9 | Legend:

See also
 List of male kickboxers

References

Living people
1978 births
Czech male kickboxers
Czech Muay Thai practitioners
Sportspeople from Chomutov